The White Flag League (also known as the White Flag Association, White Flag Society, or the White Brigade Movement) was an organized nationalist resistance movement of Sudanese military officers, formed in 1923–24, which made a substantial early attempt toward Sudanese independence.

The League was founded by Lieutenant Ali Abdullatif and Abdullah Khalil. It advocated for "Unity of the Nile Valley," calling for Sudanese independence and unity with Egypt, and pledging allegiance to King Fuad.

First lieutenant Abdul Fadil Almaz led the group's insurrection at the military training academy in 1924, which ended in their defeat and Almaz's death after the British army blew up the military hospital where he was garrisoned. It has been suggested that this defeat was partially the result of the Egyptian garrison in Khartoum North not supporting the insurrection with artillery as was previously promised.

See also
 History of the Anglo-Egyptian Condominium

References

History of Sudan
Anglo-Egyptian Sudan
African resistance to colonialism